Ph.D is a Japanese industrial designer born in Fukui Prefecture in 1949. He graduated from Kanazawa College of Art in 1972.
Kawasaki is a professor at Osaka University and a visiting professor at Tama Art University and Kanazawa Institute of Technology. Representative works include the wheelchair "CARNA" (part of the permanent collection at MoMA New York), the "Kazuo Kawasaki" brand of eyeware and the "EIZO" brand of computer displays.

One of his research projects is artificial heart design.

Kawasaki was Apple design director in the early 1990s and designed portable computer devices (named MindTop, POPEYE, Pluto, Sweatpea, JEEP).

References

External links 
 KazuoKAWASAKI.jp
 Kazuo KAWASAKI Progressive Inclusive Design Office
 KazuoKAWASAKI official Blog
 KazuoKAWASAKI artgene Blog
 OUZAK Design
 21st Century Museum of Contemporary Art 「artificial heart：Kazuo Kawasaki」
 EIZO
 FORIS.TV
 Kazuo Kawasaki MASUNAGA
 TAKEFU KNIFE VILLAGE
 Lemnos
 STUDIO VOICE ONLINE

1949 births
Living people
Apple Inc. employees
Japanese industrial designers
Japanese people with disabilities
Academic staff of Osaka University
People from Fukui Prefecture